Aaron Ruell (born June 23, 1976) is an American director, photographer and actor. He is most recognized for his performance as Kip Dynamite in the indie movie Napoleon Dynamite.

Early life and education
Ruell was born in Fresno, California and raised in a Mormon family in nearby Clovis. After graduation from Clovis West High School, Ruell studied film at Brigham Young University.

Career

Director
Ruell is an accomplished commercial director and photographer.  As a director he is represented by Sanctuary in Los Angeles.  He was declared one of the most promising new directors in the world of advertising by Shoot magazine in 2009, and "one of the emerging directors to know now" by Creativity. He has directed commercials for clients such as T-Mobile, Nintendo, Coke, and Burger King.

He was the only filmmaker to have two films, Everything's Gone Green and Mary, which he wrote and directed, premiere at the 2005 Sundance Film Festival.

Actor
Ruell is best known for playing the role of Kipland Dynamite in the movie Napoleon Dynamite. In 2007, he starred in On the Road with Judas, which premiered in the Dramatic Competition section of the 2007 Sundance Film Festival. Ruell played a successful New York businessman who led a double life as a computer thief.

Personal life
Ruell and his wife, Yuka, were at one time members of the Los Angeles Latebirds, an official Moped Army branch. They currently reside in Portland, Oregon after having resided in Pasadena, California.

Filmography

Awards and nominations
Teen Choice Awards
2005: Nominated, "Choice Movie Rockstar Moment" - Napoleon Dynamite

References

External links

Aaron Ruell's photography site
Aaron Ruell's commercials
Aaron Ruell's Book
Interview with Aaron Ruell 

American male film actors
Latter Day Saints from California
Male actors from Fresno, California
Brigham Young University alumni
Living people
People from Clovis, California
People from Fresno, California
21st-century American male actors
1976 births